Deshabhimani is a Malayalam newspaper and the organ of the Kerala State Committee of the Communist Party of India (Marxist). It started as a weekly in Calicut on 6 September 1942 and converted to a daily in 1946. The paper now has ten different printing centres: Calicut, Cochin, Trivandrum, Kannur, Kottayam, Trichur, Palakkad, Alappuzha, Kollam and Malappuram. At present, Puthalath Dinesan State Secretariat Member  of the CPI(M) is the Chief Editor of the paper, K.J. Thomas, CPI(M), secretariat member of the CPI(M), the General Manager and V. B Parameshwaran, the Resident Editor.

Deshabhimani is the third-largest Malayalam language newspaper by circulation. As of Indian Readership Survey of 2010, it was also in the third position in terms of readership in Kerala, after Malayala Manorama and Mathrubhumi.

The news website is published under a public open license CC-BY 4.0.

History

Deshabhimani has a predecessor, Prabhatham (which means 'Dawn'). It was started in 1935 and was the manifesto of the socialist group in the Indian National Congress. It was in 1942, through the efforts of eminent leaders like A K Gopalan and E M S Namboodiripad (who in fact donated all of his ancestral property for raising funds for the paper) Deshabhimani started and became the voice of the Communist Party of India and later became the voice of Communist Party of India (Marxist), after the split from CPI in 1964. Various personalities like E.M.S. Namboodiripad, V. T. Induchoodan, K P R Gopalan, E. K. Nayanar and V. S. Achuthanandan, have served as the chief editors of Deshabhimani.
Many notable journalists of South India work with Deshabhimani. Journalists who have worked with Deshabhimani include P Govindapillai, Ezhacherry Ramachandran,  Prabha Varma, K. Mohanan, C.M. Abdul Rehman, Narikutti Mohanan, P.M. Manoj and B. Aburaj.

Supplements
 Deshabhimani Varanthappathippu
 Aksharamuttam
 Sthree
 Kilivaathil
 Thozhil

Publications
 Deshabhimani Varika (Weekly)
 Thathamma (Children's Publication)

References

External links
 Deshabhimani online edition

1942 establishments in India
Communist newspapers
Communist Party of India (Marxist)
Communist periodicals published in India
Malayalam-language newspapers
Newspapers established in 1942
Weekly newspapers published in India
Newspapers published in Kerala